Ștevia River may refer to:
 Ștevia, a tributary of the Azuga in Prahova County, Romania
 Ștevia, a tributary of the Râușor in Hunedoara County, Romania
 Ștevia, a tributary of the Rudăreasa in Vâlcea County, Romania